Castle Hill Village is an alpine village in Canterbury, New Zealand that started in 1982.

Location
Castle Hill Village is located in Selwyn District. It is located adjacent to  just north of the Thomas River. Nearby are the distinctive limestone boulders of Castle Hill. The boulders are located within the Kura Tawhiti Conservation Area. The Craigieburn Range forms the backdrop for the location.

History
During the time of the West Coast Gold Rush in the mid-1860s, a hotel was built along the coach road that is now State Highway 73; traces of Castle Hill Hotel can be found immediately opposite to Castle Hill Village. The coach traffic disappeared when the Midland Line was extended to Arthur's Pass just prior to World War I; this withdrew the financial basis for the hotel.

After sub-dividing land from his high country Castle Hill Station in 1981, John Reid started the village in 1982. The first sections on sale for $10,000.  Reid later sold his remaining land holdings except for the land opposite the village for a 9-hole golf course.

Demographics
It is part of the statistical area of Craigieburn. 

7026669 had a population of 18 at the 2018 New Zealand census, a decrease of 27 people (-60.0%) since the 2013 census, and an increase of 9 people (100.0%) since the 2006 census. There were 9 households. There were 12 males and 6 females, giving a sex ratio of 2.0 males per female. The median age was 66.7 years (compared with 37.4 years nationally).

Today

In 2022, there were over 150 houses in the village. Most are holiday homes but some have permanent residents, including Reid who still lives there. There are no public facilities other than a public toilet at the village hall and a children's playground.

Selwyn District has set separate design rules in its district plan for buildings in Castle Hill Village so that the alpine character of the location is reflected. In 2020, a resource consent allowing up to 111 new plots was granted. 

Mountain biking is popular around Castle Hill Village with the Hogsback track connecting Castle Hill Village with Texas Flat on the Mount Cheeseman Ski Field Road. The majority of the track construction was carried out in a series of community work parties over the 2010/2011 summer.

Castle Hill Village's proximity to the Porters Ski Resort, Mount Cheesman, Broken River and Craigieburn Ski Fields makes it popular with Christchurch residents during the winter.

Climate

Notes

Selwyn District
Populated places in Canterbury, New Zealand
Populated places established in 1982